José Rivas Fontán, (San Martín de Verducido, España on August 31, 1941), is a Spanish politician and teacher who was the Mayor of Pontevedra between 1979 and 1991.  He withdrew from public activity in 2004 and is currently retired.

Biography

Family 
José Rivas Fontán was born on 31 August 1941 in San Martín de Verducido - Xeve, in the municipality and province of Pontevedra. He is the son of Paulino Rivas Maquieira and Elvira Fontán Fontán and was the youngest of three brothers. In 1965, he married Mª Gloria Lis Corral. The couple had four children (María Gloria, Patricia, Mónica and José)

Formation phase and initial political career 
He spent his childhood in a parish near the town of Pontevedra, where he attended a state primary school from the age of six.  He cycled daily to secondary school and, later, Teacher Training college in Pontevedra, 8 kilometres from his home.  He also carried out his compulsory military service in the capital, where he was stationed at the military headquarters. He studied for and passed the state teachers entry exam in 1963 to become a teacher of adults.

He sat a special exam, set up by the Ministry of Education, for the Organisation of School Services for education inspectors in Pontevedra.  There, he launched one of the first teaching applied audiovisual media centres in Spain.  At that point, he met Federico Cifuentes Pérez, who was to become his boss and friend and, years later, would turn out to be an essential collaborator in the Pontevedra Teachers Movement (MMS).

In Pontevedra towards the end of the 60s and beginning of the 70s, the educational community began to question the educational system which, as much as was possible at that time, had a labour movement, the Spanish Teaching Service (SEM).  The new tendency strove to change it, from within, into  democratic unionism.  This movement would later spread to all the Spanish provinces.  Said democratic organisation clashed with the political regime (Francisco Franco's dictatorship) and after many difficulties and risk, culminated in the “1st EGB Congress of Pontevedra” in 1977.  It was attended by representatives from the whole of Spain as well as by the French “Fédération de l’éducation nationale” (FEN).  Because of his work in the Education Inspectors Corps, José Rivas Fontán was familiar with the educational structure in his province and, together with other colleagues, organized this movement organically and territorially into democratically elected cells with himself as the first Provincial Secretary of the Association.  At this time, the Pontevedra Teachers Association published the only issue of the newspaper TEUCRO  which, when it had already been sent to all the provinces, was censored.

Political life

Constituent process 
On June 15, 1977, there was a free general election in Spain for the first time since 1931.  José Rivas was elected as Deputy for Pontevedra in the Spanish Parliament as a member of the UCD Party.  He formed part of the UCD Political Council .

In 1978, he was General Secretary of the Galician Junta's pre-autonomous government under the presidency of Antonio Rosón Pérez.  He was Secretary of the Galician Parliamentary Assembly which comprised all elected MPs as well as the senators chosen by the Crown, the Nobel prize winner Camilo José Cela and Domingo García Sabell.  He was constituent Secretary of the 16 Commissions, created to draw up the Galician Statutes.

Mayor of Pontevedra 
In 1979, he was elected Mayor of Pontevedra for UCD for a 4-year term, then re-elected as an independent candidate for AP and, finally, in 1987, for the Independent Galician Party until 1991.

Due to a prolonged persecution by the Head Judge of number 3 Court in Pontevedra (Luciano Varela), he did not run again in 1991 and left politics.  Rivas denounced him to the General Judicial Council and the Ombudsman. After having been tried and judged for anonymous allegations on various occasions, Rivas was acquitted on all counts by the Provincial Court of Pontevedra and the Supreme Court in Madrid .

Latter activities 
He was the spokesperson for the Provincial Museum of Pontevedra Trust from 1979 to 1983.  In 1980, he was elected vice-president of the Spanish Federation of Municipalities and Provinces (FEMP).  He was spokesperson for the Executive Commission of the Supreme Sports Council representing town councils  and for their Board of Directors. In 1983, he was a member of the Directive Committee of the European Council of Municipalities based in Paris.  He was in the Spanish Delegation at the European Council's Regional Powers Conference in Strasbourg, France.  In 1985, the Ministry of Public Administration (Ministry and FEMP) set up a National Commission to study the upcoming Local Regimen Law, of which he was vice-president.  In 1986, he was appointed a trustee of the Alfredo Brañas Cultural Foundation in Santiago de Compostela.  He withdrew from political activity between 1991 and 1996.

Return to Politics 
In 1996 and 2000, he was re-elected as an MP in the 6th  and 7th   legislatures, acting as a member of Commissions for Education, Public Administration, Infrastructure and Defence.  As a member of the latter, he was in the Security Commission of the NATO Parliamentary Assembly, attending meetings held in various countries around the world (USA, Germany, Russia, Norway, Slovakia, Macedonia, Lithuania, Latvia, Turkey, Uzbekistan, etc.).

Other Interventions 
 Spoke at the Caracas Galician Brotherhood on the theme of the poet Luis Amado Carballo, from Pontevedra
 Formed part of the Commission on Self-government in the Spanish Senate, studying the upcoming Local Regimen Law
 Speaker based on the new Local Regimen Law at the summer courses at the International University Menéndez Pelayo in Santander
 Appeared on the TV programme La Clave, presented by José Luis Balbín, along with other Spanish mayors
 Stood for the abolition of the death penalty during the drafting of the Spanish constitution (1978)
 Presented the book “Just Rivas Fontán.  Memoirs of a politician far from the flock” at the Municipal Theatre in Pontevedra

Recognitions and awards 
 Member of the Constitutional Order of Merit, with the honours, distinctions and use of insignia corresponding to the Order's regulations, for his relevant activities serving the Constitution
 Gold Medal and member of the Order of Diego de Losada, Republic of Venezuela
 Gold Medal from the town council of Lepanto, Greece

Other qualifications 
 Expert in National Defence from Rey Juan Carlos University.
 Honours graduate in Latinamerican co-operation in the military field from Rey Juan Carlos University.

References

See also

Bibliography 
 Roberto Taboada Rivadulla (R. Taboada). 30 años de corporaciones municipales. Pontevedra (España): 2010. [].
 Graciano Palomo (Ediciones Martínez Roca, S.A.). Rumbo a lo desconocido. Historia secreta de los años más convulsos del PP. Madrid (España): 2008. [].
 Adrián Rodríguez (alvarellos EDITORA). "Solo Rivas Fontán. Memorias de un político lejos del rebaño". Santiago de Compostela (España): 2016. [].

External links 
 El 23-F muchos de mis concejales escaparon y otros se protegieron en casas de la derecha. Faro de Vigo (23/02/2011)
 A la Caza de la Noticia - Pontevedra 1980 Sprinter y Rivas Fontan. Programa "Vivir cada día: A la caza de la noticia" (1980)
  En 1983 un grupo político superó la barrera de los 13 concejales. La Voz de Galicia (19/04/2011)
  Un hombre derecho. El Mundo (22/03/2014)
  Rivas Fontán al teléfono. Diario de Pontevedra (22/05/2015)
  La liberación de un triple exalcalde abierto en canal”]. La Voz de Galicia (15/05/2016)
 [http://diariodepontevedra.galiciae.com/blog/544789/rivas-fontan-por-adrian-rodriguez  Rivas Fontán, por Adrián Rodríguez”. Diario de Pontevedra (15/05/2016)
  José Rivas Fontán: "La política es un mundo donde se utilizan las peores mañas" . Faro de Vigo (16/05/2016)
 Rivas Fontán: "Un libro para reflexionar" . Diario de Pontevedra (24/05/2016)
 Rivas Fontán: "Una vida dedicada a la política" . «Vía V»(cap.1070-parte1) (07/07/2016)

1941 births
Living people
People from Pontevedra
20th-century Spanish politicians
Union of the Democratic Centre (Spain) politicians
Recipients of the Order of Constitutional Merit
Politicians from Galicia (Spain)
Mayors of Pontevedra
Spanish municipal councillors